Chen Hong (born December 13, 1968) is a Chinese actress and film producer. She married film director Chen Kaige in 1996 and they have two sons. In recent years, she has co-produced and acted in the films Together, The Promise and Forever Enthralled. She is also known for her role as Diaochan in the 1994 television series Romance of the Three Kingdoms.

Filmography

Film

Television

References

External links
 

1968 births
Living people
Actresses from Jiangxi
Chinese film producers
People from Shangrao
Shanghai Theatre Academy alumni
Chinese stage actresses
20th-century Chinese actresses
21st-century Chinese actresses
Chinese film actresses
Chinese television actresses